Bobby Ritter (born March 24, 1960) is an American football coach. He is head football coach at Middlebury College, a position he has held since the 2001 season, following the retirement of Mickey Heinecken. Through the 2019 season, Ritter has compiled a 102–53 record and won three New England Small College Athletic Conference (NESCAC) championships, in 2007, 2013 and 2019.

In 2019, Middlebury became the first team in NESCAC football history to finish with a 9–0 record, as the Panthers captured their fourth NESCAC title. The 2019 Middlebury squad joined the 8–0 teams of 1936 and 1972 as the only undefeated teams in school history. Ritter was awarded the 2019 D3football.com All-East Region Coach of the Year and 2019 Gridiron Club of Greater Boston - New England Division III Coach of the Year.

Head coaching record

References

External links
 Middlebury profile

1960 births
Living people
Middlebury Panthers football coaches
Middlebury Panthers football players
Tufts Jumbos football coaches
People from Holden, Massachusetts
Sportspeople from Worcester County, Massachusetts
Coaches of American football from Massachusetts
Players of American football from Massachusetts